Pighalta Aasman is a 1985 Indian Hindi-language film produced and directed by Shammi. It stars Shashi Kapoor, Raakhee, Rati Agnihotri in pivotal roles.

Story
Delhi-based businesswoman Aarti Singh Rathod lives a wealthy lifestyle along with Nanny, Suku, and friend and employee, Anuradha. She decides to travel to Kashmir and take possession of a piece of her land that is being occupied by Suraj Arora. Her Nanny tells her she was brought up by the Arora family until her dad, Karan Singh, became wealthy and broke off all relations with them. Once in Kashmir, all differences are forgotten and both Suraj and Arti fall in love with each other. Arti's life will soon change after she finds out that Anuradha, too, has fallen in love with Suraj, and this discovery will not only create complications and competitiveness between the two women, but also change everyone's lives forever.

Cast

 Shashi Kapoor as Suraj Arora / Prakash Arora
 Raakhee as Aarti Singh Rathod
 Rati Agnihotri as Anuradha "Anu"
 Deven Verma as Badal 
 A.K. Hangal as Masterji
 Leela Mishra as Suku
 Sudhir Pandey as Lala Karan Singh Rathod
 Master Ravi...Bansi
 Sushma Seth as Karuna Arora
 Sunder Taneja...Tiwari

Soundtrack
Lyrics provided by Indeevar, Maya Govind, Ila Arun and Anjaan.

References

External links

1980s Hindi-language films
1985 films
Films scored by Kalyanji Anandji